Aliaksandr Bachko (born 15 August 1989) is a Belarusian handball player for KS Azoty-Puławy and the Belarusian national team.

References

1989 births
Living people
Sportspeople from Grodno
Belarusian male handball players
Expatriate handball players in Poland
Belarusian expatriate sportspeople in Finland
Belarusian expatriate sportspeople in Poland